This is a list of tribute albums (and individual covers) of the Australian hard rock band AC/DC. Due to AC/DC's worldwide popularity, many musicians have made tribute albums to the band. These albums have been made by a variety of different artists from across several different genres, such as bluegrass music and death metal. AC/DC's influence has also meant that their individual songs have also been frequently covered by other artists.

Tribute albums

Individual covers

Many different musicians have covered AC/DC's songs, proving the band's influence on many different artists from across numerous music genres, as the list shows:

References

External links

 
Ac Dc